Chaeryŏng County is a county in South Hwanghae province, North Korea.

Geography
Located on the Chaeryŏng River, the county is bordered to the west by Anak and Sinch'ŏn, to the south by Sinwŏn, and to the east by Ŭnp'a, Pongsan and Sariwŏn in North Hwanghae Province.

History
Chaeryŏng County was first founded by the kingdom of Koguryo, who called it Siksŏng. Koguryo lost the area during the unification of Korea by the Koryo dynasty, who gave it its current name in 1217. In 1415 it was promoted to county level under the Yi. Chaeryŏng was briefly merged into the newly formed Hwanghae District in 1895 during an experimental redistricting, but was restored to its previous form in 1896. During Japanese rule, which lasted from 1910 to 1945, the county was called Sainei (載寧). The county's current form was settled in the 1952 redistricting changes.

Transportation
Chaeryŏng county is served by the Ŭllyul Line of the Korean State Railway. There is also a highway which runs through Chaeryŏng-ŭp.

Administrative divisions
The county is divided into one town (ŭp), one worker's district (rodongjagu) and 24 villages (ri).

People born in Chaeryŏng
 Song Hae (1927–2022, born Song Bok-hui), South Korean singer and comedian, best known as host of Korea Sings (1980–present)
 Choi Eun-Taek (1938–2007), South Korean football coach

See also
Geography of North Korea
Administrative divisions of North Korea

References

Counties of South Hwanghae